Patika is a village in Rae Parish, Harju County, in northern Estonia. On 1 January 2010, it had a population of 322.

Population

References

Villages in Harju County